The 2003–04 NLA season was the 66th regular season of the Nationalliga A, the main professional ice hockey league in Switzerland.

Regular season

Final standings

Scoring leaders

Note: GP = Games played; G = Goals; A = Assists; Pts = Points;  PIM = Penalty Minutes

Playoffs

Quarterfinals

Semifinals

Finals

Scoring leaders

Note: GP = Games played; G = Goals; A = Assists; Pts = Points;  PIM = Penalty Minutes

Playout round 
Teams ranked from 9 - 13 after regular season, played 2 games against each other.

Final standings 

EHC Basel is relegated to Nationalliga B.

League qualification 

HC Lausanne stays in Nationalliga A.

References 
sehv.ch
hockeystats.ch

Results from Puck.ch 
LNA Regular Season 2003-2004
Playoff 2003-2004
Playout 2003-2004
LNA/LNB promotion/relegation

External links
hockeyfans.ch
eishockeyforum.ch
spoor.ch

1
Swiss